Shakka may refer to:

 Shakka (film), 1981 Bollywood Action film
 Shakka (god), Babylonian and Akkadian patron god of herdsmen
 Shakka (singer), British singer, songwriter and producer

See also
 Shaka (disambiguation)